RSS Invincible is the lead ship of the s. She was launched on 18 February 2019 in Kiel, Germany.

Design 
The design is expected to be influenced by the export Type 214 submarine or Type 216 submarine, which have been designed for the potential needs of several other navies (Australian, Canadian and Indian). Features will include AIP and a combat system designed by both Atlas Elektronik and ST Electronics. The Invincible class also features an "X" rudder "which offers enhanced manoeuvrability in confined littoral waters, as opposed to the Type 214's cruciform rudder arrangement.
The X rudder is used on the Type 212 submarine and its larger and newer derivative, the Dolphin 2-class submarine built for the Israeli Navy which is almost identical in size to the Invincible-class submarine (Israel and Singapore have extensive military ties and frequently procure the same weapon systems).

They are believed to have Horizontal Multi-Purpose Airlock, which can be used to launch either torpedoes, divers, or special forces assault teams, and also have the capability to launch cruise-missiles while submerged with an option for Vertical Multi-Purpose Airlock, for launching missile vertically, like the Tomahawk or Naval Strike Missile

References 

Attack submarines
Ships of the Republic of Singapore Navy
2019 ships
Invincible-class submarines
Republic of Singapore Navy